The development of technology in Silesia started towards the end of the 18th century when the Prussian authorities created a special department for mining and metallurgy under the direction of the Count Frederic Wilhelm von Reden. Upper Silesian heavy industry, for two centuries, occupied the leading position in Europe in terms of technology, economy and workers' welfare.

Places to visit to see this progression of technology
 Bielsko-Biała Museum
 Technology and Textile Industry Museum
 Dom Tkacza – Museum the Weaver's House
 Bobrek Steel Mill
 The Elzbieta Mine Shaft
 Częstochowa
 The Building Complex of the Former "Saturn" Coal Mine
 Glivice Steel Mill
 Nikiszowiec is an example of a workers colony from the beginning of the 20th century
 The Fizinus Shafts
 Zabrze a steam operated lift machine dating from 1915 is an object of interest in the mine

History of Silesia
Industrial history of Germany